The following lists of constellations are available:
 IAU designated constellations - a list of the current, or "modern", constellations.
 Former constellations - a list of former constellations.
 Chinese constellations - traditional Chinese astronomy constellations.
 List of Nakshatras - sectors along the Moon's ecliptic.
IAU designated constellations by area - a list of constellations ranked by area.

See also 
 Lists of astronomical objects
 Asterism (astronomy)